Yuliya Kosenkova (born 28 March 1973, Omsk) is a former Russian middle distance runner who specialized in the 1500 metres.

Achievements

Personal bests
800 metres - 2:00.2 min (2001)
1500 metres - 4:03.66 min (2004)
One mile - 4:29.32 min (2004)
3000 metres - 9:17.75 min (1998)

External links

1973 births
Living people
Russian female middle-distance runners
20th-century Russian women
21st-century Russian women